The 1946 San Jose State Spartans football team represented San Jose State College during the 1946 college football season.

San Jose State competed in the California Collegiate Athletic Association. The team was led by head coach Wilbur V. Hubbard, in his first year, and they played home games at Spartan Stadium in San Jose, California. They finished the season as Champion of the CCAA, with a record of nine wins and one loss and one tie (9–1–1, 4–0 CCAA). At the end of the season, the Spartans were invited to the second annual Raisin Bowl, played in Fresno, California vs. the Mountain States Conference co-champion, Utah State Agricultural Aggies. On January 1, 1947, San Jose State shut out Utah State 20–0. This was the first bowl appearance for San Jose State.

Schedule

Team players in the NFL
The following San Jose State players were selected in the 1947 NFL Draft.

Notes

References

San Jose State
San Jose State Spartans football seasons
California Collegiate Athletic Association football champion seasons
San Jose State Spartans football